The 1981 Mr. Olympia contest was an IFBB professional bodybuilding competition held on October 10, 1981, at the Veterans Memorial Auditorium in Columbus, Ohio. Following the 1980 Mr. Olympia political controversy, a number of favored bodybuilders boycotted the event, including Frank Zane, Mike Mentzer, and Boyer Coe. Franco Columbu followed Arnold Schwarzenegger's suit (1980 Mr Olympia) and came out of retirement for a one time appearance and won the Olympia.

Results

Total prize money awarded was $50,000.

References

External links 
 Mr. Olympia

 1981
1981 in American sports
1981 in bodybuilding